The final of the Women's 400 metres Freestyle event at the European LC Championships 1997 was held on Thursday 21 August 1997 in Seville, Spain.

Finals

Qualifying heats

See also
1996 Women's Olympic Games 400m Freestyle
1997 Women's World Championships (SC) 400m Freestyle

References
 scmsom results
 La Gazzetta Archivio
 swimrankings

F